This is a list of airports in Burkina Faso, sorted by location.



Airports

See also 
 Transport in Burkina Faso
 List of airports by ICAO code: D#DF - Burkina Faso
 Wikipedia: WikiProject Aviation/Airline destination lists: Africa#Burkina Faso

References 

 
  - includes IATA codes
 Great Circle Mapper: Airports in Burkina Faso
 World Aero Data: Burkina Faso
 Faso Airport records for Burkina Faso at Landings.com. Retrieved 2013-08-22

 
Airports
Burkina Faso
Airports
Burkina Faso